Emma Rise Madsen (born 18 November 1988) is a Danish former football striker. She played for Brøndby IF of the Elitedivisionen.

Club career
Until 2008, she played for Skovlunde IF. She played for Brøndby IF since 2009. In 2015 she stopped her career.

International career
Madsen was called up to be part of the national team for the UEFA Women's Euro 2013. She was a late replacement for Sanne Troelsgaard Nielsen, who withdrew for family reasons.

Honours

Club
Brøndby IF
Winner
 Elitedivisionen: 2010–11, 2011–12, 2012–13
 Danish Women's Cup: 2010–11, 2011–12, 2012–13

References

External links
 
 Profile at fussballtransfers.de
 Profile at soccerdonna.de
 
 Profile at dbu.dk

1988 births
Living people
Danish women's footballers
Denmark women's international footballers
Brøndby IF (women) players
Women's association football midfielders
Ballerup-Skovlunde Fodbold (women) players